Yerry Fernando Mina González (born 23 September 1994) is a Colombian professional footballer who plays as a centre-back for  club Everton and the Colombia national team. He shares the record for most goals in a single World Cup by a defender, with three scored at the 2018 FIFA World Cup.

Club career

Deportivo Pas
Born in Guachené, Mina was a Deportivo Pasto youth graduate, joining the side only at the age of 18. Promoted to the main squad during the 2013 season, he made his senior debut on 20 March of that year by starting in a 0–1 away loss against Dépor in the year's Copa Colombia.

Mina made his Categoría Primera A debut on 15 September 2013, starting in a 0–0 draw at Deportivo Cali. His first professional goal occurred on 18 October, as he scored his team's first in a 2–2 home draw against Atlético Huila.

Independiente Santa Fe
On 14 December 2013, Mina moved to fellow top-tier club Independiente Santa Fe, initially on a one-year loan deal. Mina made his debut for the club the following 25 January, playing the full 90 minutes in a 3–0 home win against Rionegro. 

He proved to be a vital piece in the successful era enjoyed by the club, both domestically and internationally. In his first full year, he was part of the team that won the Colombian league Categoría Primera A Finalización 2014, defeating Independiente Medellín in the Final. 

Mina then contributed to the 2015 Superliga Colombiana victory by netting the first goal in the 2–0 win against Atlético Nacional in the second leg of the Finals.

Mina was a regular starter during his tenure at Santa Fe, which culminated in the 2015 championship winning Copa Sudamericana campaign.

Palmeiras

On 1 May 2016, Mina was confirmed as the new player of Palmeiras, but only joined the club in the following month. He signed a five-year contract with the club eleven days later.

Mina made his debut for the club on 4 July 2016, playing a full game in a 3–1 away defeat of Sport Recife. His first goal for the Verdão arrived in the following fixture, a 1–1 draw against Santos. He was, however, rotated off just before the end of the first half due to an apparent injury.  He was carried off the field on a stretcher, in tears. On 13 July it was confirmed that Mina would not recover in time for the 2016 Summer Olympics, with the recuperation from his injury expected to take 6 to 8 weeks.

By late August 2016, Mina had fully recovered from his injury, and was an undisputed starter during the latter stages of the season. In September, he scored goals against rivals São Paulo and Corinthians, and finished the year with four league goals as his team was awarded the trophy for the first time in 22 years.

Barcelona
On 11 January 2018, FC Barcelona and Palmeiras reached an agreement regarding the transfer of Yerry Mina for the remainder of the current season and five more seasons, until 30 June 2023. This made him the first-ever Colombian to play for the club. The cost of the transfer was €11.8 million, and his release clause was set at €100 million.

Mina made his debut replacing Gerard Piqué in the 83rd minute of the Copa del Rey semi-final against Valencia. Barcelona would go on to win the match 2–0 and advance to the final. He would make his home and league debut against Getafe, starting and playing the full game to a 0–0 draw. He made his first official contribution at the club as he assisted Ousmane Dembélé in a 5–1 win against Villarreal.

Everton
On 8 August 2018, Mina signed with Premier League team Everton in a deal worth €30 million.

His first appearance came during a 3–1 home victory against Brighton & Hove Albion, as a last-minute substitute for Gylfi Sigurðsson.

He scored his first goal for Everton in a 5–1 away win against Burnley, a header during the opening two minutes of the match following a cross from Bernard.

He scored his first brace for Everton on 1 February 2020 against Watford at Vicarage Road, scoring them both in stoppage time at the end of the first half in a game that Everton came from 2–0 down to win 2–3.

Mina opened his scoring account for Everton in the 2020–21 season with a bullet header against Brighton in a 4–2 victory at Goodison Park on 3 October 2020.

International career

In 2016, Mina was named to Colombia's Copa América Centenario squad, starting one game against Costa Rica. He played in five of Colombia's 2018 World Cup Qualifying matches from October 2016 to March 2017, and in May 2018 he was named to Colombia's final 23-man squad for the 2018 World Cup in Russia.

At the 2018 World Cup, Mina scored three goals for Colombia, all headers. Mina did not play in Colombia's opening 2–1 loss with Japan, but started at centre back in each of Colombia's remaining matches. In the group stage, he scored the opening goal in a 3–0 win over Poland, then scored the lone goal in a 1–0 win over Senegal which propelled Colombia to the top of their group and into the knockout stage. Against England in the round of sixteen, Mina tied the scoring 1–1 in the 93rd minute to send the game into extra time. Colombia went on to lose the game on penalty kicks, ending their tournament. With his three goals, he tied the record number of goals scored by a defender in a single World Cup tournament, sharing the record with Germans Paul Breitner in 1974 and Andreas Brehme in 1990.

Personal life
Yerry Mina's father and uncle were both professional football goalkeepers. His father advised him to play another position, and his uncle took him to Deportivo Pasto's trial. His brother, Juan José, is also a footballer.

His uncle, Jair Mina, is also his agent.

Mina is a devout Christian and is a member of the neo-Pentecostal Church of God Ministry of Jesus Christ International. Mina has spoken publicly at many events sponsored by the church to talk about his life and faith.

Career statistics

Club

International

Scores and results list Colombia's goal tally first.

Honours
Independiente Santa Fe
Categoría Primera A: 2014-II 2014
Copa Sudamericana: 2015
Superliga Colombiana: 2015

Palmeiras
Campeonato Brasileiro Série A: 2016

Barcelona
La Liga: 2017–18
Copa del Rey: 2017–18

Individual
Campeonato Brasileiro Série A Team of the Year: 2016
Campeonato Paulista Team of the Year: 2017
FIFA World Cup Fantasy Team: 2018
 FIFA FIFPro World XI 5th team: 2018

References

External links

Profile at the Everton F.C. website

1994 births
Living people
Colombian Pentecostals
Members of the Church of God Ministry of Jesus Christ International
Sportspeople from Cauca Department
Colombian footballers
Association football central defenders
Deportivo Pasto footballers
Independiente Santa Fe footballers
Sociedade Esportiva Palmeiras players
FC Barcelona players
Everton F.C. players
Categoría Primera A players
Campeonato Brasileiro Série A players
La Liga players
Premier League players
Colombia international footballers
Copa América Centenario players
2018 FIFA World Cup players
2019 Copa América players
2021 Copa América players
Colombian expatriate footballers
Colombian expatriate sportspeople in Brazil
Colombian expatriate sportspeople in Spain
Colombian expatriate sportspeople in England
Expatriate footballers in Brazil
Expatriate footballers in Spain
Expatriate footballers in England
Colombian people of African descent